Bhaurao is an Indian given name. Notable persons with this name include:

 Bhaurao Patil, social activist and educator in Maharashtra
 Bhaurao Datar, Indian film actor
 Bhaurao Gaikwad, Indian social activist and politician from Maharashtra
 Bhaurao Dagadurao Deshmukh, Indian politician from Maharashtra
 B. D. Khobragade, Indian politician and lawyer
 Bhavurao Deshpande, Indian politician from Karnataka